Umbrail Pass (elevation ) is a high mountain pass on the Swiss-Italian border connecting Santa Maria in Val Müstair with Bormio in the Adda valley. On the Italian side, it connects to the Stelvio Pass road and the Valtellina. It is currently the highest paved road in Switzerland.

The sign at the top of the pass gives its elevation as 2,503 meters above sea level, but the reference level for Swiss elevation measurements has changed since the sign was erected, leaving 2,501 meters as the correct value according to current elevation.

The pass is named after the "Piz Umbrail", a nearby mountain peak.

The road is entirely asphalted since 2015. The last unpaved section was a 1.5 km stretch on the Swiss side, running between elevations of 1883 m and 2012 m. During the 2017 Giro d'Italia, Umbrail Pass was reached during the stage from Rovetta to Bormio.

See also
List of highest paved roads in Europe
Principal passes of the Alps

External links

Profile on climbbybike.com
Pictures from a crossing in August 2010 
Cycling up to the Umbrailpass: data, profile, map, photos and description

Mountain passes of the Alps
Mountain passes of Graubünden
Mountain passes of Italy
Italy–Switzerland border crossings